William Alanson Howard (April 8, 1813 – April 10, 1880) served as a member of the United States House of Representatives from Michigan from March 4, 1855 to March 3, 1859 and from May 15, 1860 to March 3, 1861.  Howard was the sixth Governor of the Dakota Territory from 1878 to 1880.

Biography
William Howard was born at Hinesburg, Vermont.  When he was fourteen, Howard apprenticed to a cabinet maker at Albion, New York.  He graduated from Middlebury College at Middlebury, Vermont in 1839.  Howard taught school before moving to Michigan for health reasons.  Howard spent a year teaching mathematics at the University of Michigan.  Then, Howard studied law and was admitted to the Michigan bar in 1842 before practicing law in Detroit. In 1850 he was a lead defense attorney for those accused of plotting the burning of the Michigan Central Depot in Detroit.

In 1854, Howard was elected as an Opposition Party candidate to represent  in the 34th Congress, and was re-elected two years later. He successfully contested the election in 1859 of George B. Cooper to the 36th Congress and served from May 15, 1860, until March 3, 1861; was not a candidate for renomination in 1860

After leaving  Congress, he became Chairman of the Michigan Republican Party from 1862 to 1868. From 1869 to 1871, Howard served as land commissioner of the Grand Rapids and Indiana Railway. In 1871, Howard ran unsuccessfully as a Republican candidate for the United States Senate.  From 1872 to 1878, Howard was the land commissioner of the North Pacific Railway.

In 1878, Howard was appointed as Governor of Dakota Territory by President Rutherford B. Hayes.  The appointment was approved April 12, 1878.  At the age of sixty-six, Howard came to Dakota Territory and served as Governor until the time of his death, spending the last part of his life residing in Yankton, Dakota Territory.  Howard died in Washington, DC.

References

External links

The Political Graveyard
Burial record for William Alanson Howard at Findagrave.com

|-

|-

|-

1813 births
1880 deaths
19th-century American politicians
Governors of Dakota Territory
Michigan Oppositionists
Middlebury College alumni
Opposition Party members of the United States House of Representatives from Michigan
People from Hinesburg, Vermont
Republican Party members of the United States House of Representatives from Michigan
University of Michigan staff